An arch is a curved structure capable of spanning a space while supporting significant weight.

Arch, Arches, or The Arch may also refer to:

 Arches of the foot
 Arch (fingerprint), a basic pattern
 Natural arch, a rock formation shaped like an arch

Geography
 Arch Islands, Falkland Islands
 Arch, Switzerland, a municipality in the canton of Bern
 Arch Creek (Montana), United States
 Arch 22, a commemorative arch in The Gambia
 Arch Street (Philadelphia), Pennsylvania, United States
 Arches, Cantal, a commune of the Cantal département, France
 Arches, Vosges, a commune of the Vosges département, France
 Arches National Park, Utah, United States
 Arches Cluster, a massive, young cluster of stars

People
 Arch (name), a list of people with the given name or surname
 Desmond Tutu (1931–2021), South African archbishop, nicknamed "The Arch"

Arts, entertainment, and media
 Arches (Lerdahl) (2011), composition by Fred Lerdahl
 Arch (sculpture), in Lynden Sculpture Garden near Milwaukee, Wisconsin
 ARCH+, a German magazine for architecture, urbanism and design
 The Arch (nightclub), a nightclub in Brighton, England
 The Arch, a theatre space in Holden Street Theatres, Adelaide, Australia
 The Arch (film), a 1968 Hong Kong drama film
 WARH, an FM radio station serving the St. Louis, Missouri, branded "106.5 The Arch"

Science and technology
 Arch, the protein archaerhodopsin-3, a light-driven proton pump used for research in optogenetics, a technology for controlling brain activity using light
 Arch Linux, a Linux distribution that emphasizes simplicity
 GNU arch, in software, a source code management tool
RetroArch, a free and open source emulator for a wide variety of games.
Branchial arches, a series of bony "loops" present in fish, which support the gill

Ships
 SS Arches, original name of the SS English Trader
 USS Arch, original name of the Soviet minesweeper T-117

Structures
 Gateway Arch, an iconic monument in St. Louis, Missouri, U.S.
 The Arch (Hong Kong), a residential skyscraper in Kowloon, Hong Kong
 The Arch, a structure at the north entrance to the  University of Georgia which symbolizes the university

ARCH
 Action on Rights for Children, a nonprofit children's rights organisation in the U.K.
 ARCH Air Medical Service (Area Rescue Consortium of Hospitals), providing critical care air ambulance service in Missouri, Illinois, and the surrounding regions
 Autoregressive conditional heteroskedasticity, a time series regression model of the standard deviation (volatility) of a financial time series

Other uses
 Arch (horse), an American Thoroughbred racehorse
 Arch Coal, an American coal mining and processing company
 Inverted breve, a diacritic sign
 arch-, a taxonomic affix

See also
 Arc (disambiguation)
 Arche (disambiguation)
 Arch of Triumph (disambiguation)
 Arch Rock (disambiguation)
 Archway (disambiguation)